Marc Mann  is an American keyboardist, guitarist, programmer, arranger and conductor. He has a Master's Degree in Music from UCLA. Mann is known for his work with Oingo Boingo, Jeff Lynne and the Electric Light Orchestra.

Mann is credited as performer, arranger or producer on 54 albums. He is a long-time collaborator with Danny Elfman in such films as the Men in Black series, Mars Attacks!, Sleepy Hollow, plus many more. He is usually credited for MIDI supervision and some orchestrations. On stage he is recognisable because he usually wears a cap.

Selected work
Mann was supposed to play with the Electric Light Orchestra on their tour for the promotion of their album Zoom, but the tour was cancelled.

Mann played keyboards for Oingo Boingo (another collaboration with Elfman) from 1994 to1995 and performed on their final live album and video release Live from the Universal Amphitheatre.

In January 1994, Mann was hired by Lynne to help clean a few of John Lennon's cassettes, that the remaining Beatles Paul McCartney, George Harrison and Ringo Starr had finished with, and turned a few songs into Beatles songs.

In 2002, Mann made string arrangements for several songs on Harrison's posthumous Brainwashed album. On 29 November 2002, Mann performed in the "Concert for George", alongside Eric Clapton, Jeff Lynne, Billy Preston, Ringo Starr and Paul McCartney and many others, playing Harrison's parts. In 2004, Mann played lead guitar along with Prince when Harrison was inducted posthumously into the Rock and Roll Hall of Fame on the song "While My Guitar Gently Weeps."

Since then Mann has continued his collaboration with Lynne and Elfman, being credited for involvement in films such as Frankenweenie and Mr. Peabody & Sherman, as well as providing support for bands like Thenewno2.

References

External links
 Marc Mann credits on Allmusic.com
 

Year of birth missing (living people)
Living people
20th-century American keyboardists
American male guitarists
American male conductors (music)
21st-century American conductors (music)
21st-century American male musicians
20th-century American male musicians